Botovo may refer to:
Botovo, Croatia, a settlement in Drnje Municipality of Koprivnica-Križevci County, Croatia
Botovo, Russia, name of several rural localities in Russia